The men's eight was one of the competitions in the Rowing at the 1900 Summer Olympics events in Paris. It was held on 25 and 26 August 1900. 5 boats, involving 46 rowers from 5 nations, competed. The event was won by the United States, represented by the Vesper Boat Club. Silver went to the Royal Club Nautique de Gand of Belgium, with bronze to Minerva Amsterdam from the Netherlands.

Background

This was the first appearance of the event. Rowing had been on the programme in 1896 but was cancelled due to bad weather. The eight has been held every time that rowing has been contested, beginning in 1900.

Competition format

The "eight" event featured nine-person boats, with eight rowers and a coxswain. It was a sweep rowing event, with the rowers each having one oar (and thus each rowing on one side). The distance for each race was 1750 metres, rather than the 2000 metres which was becoming standard even at the time (and has been used in the Olympics since 1912, except in 1948).

The tournament featured two rounds: semifinals and a final.

 Semifinals: Two heats of 2 or 3 boats each. It was intended that the top 2 boats from each heat would advance to a 4-boat final, but when one of the boats in the 2-boat heat did not finish, the 3rd-place boat from the 3-boat heat advanced instead.
 Final: A single final of 4 boats, determining medals and 4th place.

Schedule

Results

Semifinals

The top two boats in each semifinal were intended to advance to the final. However, only one boat in the second semifinal finished, so the third-place boat in the first semifinal advanced. This meant that of the five boats competing in the semifinal, the only one to not advance was the one that did not finish.

Semifinal 1

Semifinal 2

Final

Results summary

References

External links
 International Olympic Committee medal winners database
 De Wael, Herman. Herman's Full Olympians: "Rowing 1900". Accessed 26 February 2006.
 

Rowing at the 1900 Summer Olympics